Ministry of Labor, Family, and Social Protection may refer to:
 Ministry of Labor, Family, and Social Protection (Romania)
 Ministry of Labor, Family, and Social Protection (Moldova)